Cyclocarcina is a genus of spiders in the family Nesticidae. It was first described in 1942 by Komatsu. , it contains 2 species, one of which has three subspecies, all from Japan.

References

Nesticidae
Araneomorphae genera
Spiders of Asia